María Adela Caría (12 February 1912 – 1987) was an Argentine bacteriologist, head of microbiology at the Argentine Museum of Natural Sciences, and a CONICET researcher.  She was part of the group of scientists known as the "Four of Melchior" who participated in the first fieldwork in Antarctica. Because of her work in Antarctica, a cape bears her name: Cape Caría. She was born in La Plata.

Career 

In November 1968, Caría participated in the expedition to Antarctica together with Elena Martínez Fontes, Irene Bernasconi and Carmen Pujal. After embarking on the ARA Bahía Aguirre, it was transferred to the Melchior Base, where they worked during the summer collecting specimens from Antarctica. During the expedition they travelled a thousand kilometres by boat around Antarctica, making landings to take samples. Her research contributed to the knowledge of marine algae, siliceous sponges, starfish, sea urchins and other invertebrates, as well as to the understanding of environmental microbiology.

References

1912 births
1987 deaths
20th-century Argentine women scientists
20th-century Argentine scientists
Bacteriologists
Women bacteriologists